Nicole Maree Louise Buckley-Bingham (born 25 November 1965) is an Australian television presenter and model. She became known in the early 1990s as co-host to Greg Evans on The Australian dating show Perfect Match.

Career

Buckley became co-host of the iconic television quiz show Sale of the Century with Glenn Ridge in the mid to late 1990s. In 1997, there were both complaints and support from viewers when Buckley wore an evening dress while heavily pregnant. She was a part-time weather presenter for National Nine News Melbourne on the Nine Network in 1994.

After finishing on Sale of the Century, Buckley-Bingham presented "Hot Box Office" on Foxtel pay TV, followed by presenting family and parenting segments on Good Morning Australia on Network Ten and Today on the Nine Network. She filled in for Kerri-Anne Kennerley on Kerri-Anne.

She also appeared on Dancing with the Stars on the Seven Network.

In 2006, she became the host of Talk to the Animals.

In 2013, Buckley was a fill-in presenter for Sonia Kruger on Mornings.

In 2022, Buckley co-hosted a revelationary podcast series on ageing called Oldie Goodie, alongside Matthew Ferguson and Melissa Levi.

Personal life
Buckley is married to Murray Bingham (who was also on "Sale" for many years), and they have three sons together. Their son, Cooper Alan,  was born in June 1997.

She is a regular contributor to many charities, including supporting research into ovarian cancer and bushfire preparedness.

References

External links

1965 births
Australian game show hosts
Living people
People educated at Star of the Sea College, Melbourne